Kobi Refua (born 3 September 1974) is an Israeli football manager and former player who manages Bnei Sakhnin.

Early life
Refua was born and raised in Kfar Yona, Israel, to an Israeli family of Jewish descent.

Honours

As a player
Maccabi Petah Tikva
 Toto Cup: 2003–04

Individual
 Israeli Premier League top goalscorer: 2001–02 (18 goals)

As a manager
Maccabi Sha'arayim
 Third tier: 2015–16

See also 
 List of Jewish footballers
 List of Jews in sports
 List of Jews in sports (non-players)
 List of Israelis

References

External links
Profile at One

1974 births
Living people
People from Kfar Yona
Footballers from Central District (Israel)
Israeli Jews
Israeli footballers
Association football forwards
Liga Leumit players
Israeli Premier League players
Maccabi Tel Aviv F.C. players
Hapoel Ashdod F.C. players
Hapoel Kfar Saba F.C. players
Bnei Yehuda Tel Aviv F.C. players
Maccabi Petah Tikva F.C. players
Israeli football managers
Maccabi Petah Tikva F.C. managers
Maccabi Sha'arayim F.C. managers
Hapoel Tel Aviv F.C. managers
Hapoel Ironi Kiryat Shmona F.C. managers